Ralph Charles Tyre (September 19, 1933 - May 4, 2019) was an American former politician in the state of Florida.

Tyre was born in Lake City, Florida. He was a proprietor. He served in the Florida House of Representatives from 1967 to 1970, as a Democrat, representing the 17th district.

References

2019 deaths
1933 births
Democratic Party members of the Florida House of Representatives
People from Lake City, Florida